Sharni Maree Williams  (born 2 March 1988) is a female Australian rugby union player. She has played in the centre position for Australia, the Brumbies, and from 2008 to 2012 for the Canberra Royals. She won a gold medal at the 2016 Summer Olympics in Rio.

Biography 
Williams made her international debut when winning her first Australia cap, against New Zealand on 14 October 2008 at Viking Park in Canberra. Some days before, she collected three tries in an unofficial test match won 95-0 by the Wallaroos against with the Australian President’s XV.

During the 2010 Women's Rugby World Cup in England, Williams scored one try against Wales and two in Australia's 62-0 victory over South Africa.

She was awarded ACT Rugby Rookie of the Year 2008 and Australian Women's Player of the Year 2010.

Williams made the transition to rugby sevens in 2011, earning a spot in the Australian women’s sevens team where she played every leg of the Women's Sevens World Series from its inception in November 2012. Injury ruled her out of the Sao Paulo Sevens in February 2016, however she returned in time to be named in the final round of the 2015-16 season in Clermont that saw her side win the country's first-ever World Series.

Williams was co-captain of Australia's team at the 2016 Olympics, defeating New Zealand in the final to win the inaugural Olympic gold medal in the sport.

On Australia Day 2017, Williams, along with her Rio team mates, was awarded an Order of Australia Medal.

Williams was named in the Australia squad for the Rugby sevens at the 2020 Summer Olympics.  The team came second in the pool round but then lost to Fiji 14-12 in the quarterfinals.

Williams won a gold medal with the Australian sevens team at the 2022 Commonwealth Games in Birmingham. She was a member of the Australian team that won the 2022 Sevens Rugby World Cup held in Cape Town, South Africa in September 2022. She was also selected in the Wallaroos team for the delayed 2022 Rugby World Cup in New Zealand.

Personal life 
Aside from her rugby union career, Williams is a qualified mechanic. She is openly lesbian.

Achievements and honours 
 2017, Canada Sevens Langford dream team

References

External links
 
 Wallaroos Profile

1988 births
Living people
Australian female rugby union players
Australia women's international rugby union players
Australian female rugby sevens players
People from the Riverina
Rugby union centres
Rugby union flankers
Rugby sevens players at the 2016 Summer Olympics
Olympic rugby sevens players of Australia
Olympic gold medalists for Australia
Olympic medalists in rugby sevens
Medalists at the 2016 Summer Olympics
Australia international rugby sevens players
Commonwealth Games medallists in rugby sevens
Commonwealth Games silver medallists for Australia
Rugby sevens players at the 2018 Commonwealth Games
Recipients of the Medal of the Order of Australia
Rugby sevens players at the 2020 Summer Olympics
Australian LGBT sportspeople
Rugby union players from New South Wales
Rugby sevens players at the 2022 Commonwealth Games
Medallists at the 2018 Commonwealth Games
Medallists at the 2022 Commonwealth Games